Baccharis salicifolia is a blooming shrub native to the sage scrub community and desert southwest of the United States and northern Mexico, as well as parts of South America. Its usual common name is mule fat; it is also called seepwillow or water-wally. This is a large bush with sticky foliage which bears plentiful small, fuzzy, pink or red-tinged white flowers which are highly attractive to butterflies. The long pointed leaves may be toothed and contain three lengthwise veins. It is most common near water sources.

Uses
 The Kayenta Navajo people use this plant in a compound infusion of plants used as a lotion for chills from immersion.

Another use is fire starting. Dried Baccharis salicifolia has a very low ignition temperature, very similar to the dried yucca stalk. It can be used for spindles and hand-drill shafts.

References

External links
Jepson Manual Treatment
Photo gallery

salicifolia
Flora of Northwestern Mexico
Flora of the Southwestern United States
Flora of Arizona
Flora of Baja California
Flora of California
Flora of Colorado
Flora of New Mexico
Flora of Nevada
Flora of Texas
Flora of Utah
Natural history of the California chaparral and woodlands
Flora of the California desert regions
Flora of the Cascade Range
Flora of the Klamath Mountains
Flora of the Sierra Nevada (United States)
Flora of the Sonoran Deserts
Natural history of the California Coast Ranges
Natural history of the Central Valley (California)
Natural history of the Channel Islands of California
Natural history of the Colorado Desert
Natural history of the Mojave Desert
Natural history of the Peninsular Ranges
Natural history of the San Francisco Bay Area
Natural history of the Santa Monica Mountains
Natural history of the Transverse Ranges
Plants used in traditional Native American medicine
Flora without expected TNC conservation status